Torpedo Bay is a 1963 war film directed by Charles Frend and Bruno Vailati and starring James Mason. The story is based on events that took place at Betasom, a submarine base established at Bordeaux by the Italian Navy during World War II.

The film was released as Beta Som, the Italian language acronym meaning Bordeaux Sommergibile. Phonetically B (for Bordeaux) is Beta and SOM is an abbreviation for 'Sommergibile' which is the Italian for submarine.  In the United States American International Pictures released it as a double feature with Commando (1964).

Plot
An Italian submarine captain (Gabriele Ferzetti) tries to navigate his sub through enemy waters whilst being stalked by a British commander (James Mason). The Italian sub manages to make it into the neutral port of Tangiers, Morocco followed by the British commander. During their stay, the two captains agree not to fight. They come to respect each other. Eventually the Italian sub leaves port after the Captain accuses his lover (Lilli Palmer) of spying. The British commander follows, but ends up losing his ship to the Italian's torpedoes.

Cast
James Mason - Captain Blayne
Gabriele Ferzetti - Leonardi
Lilli Palmer - Lygia da Silva
Alberto Lupo - Magri
Valeria Fabrizi - Susanne
Renato De Carmine - Ghedini
Daniele Vargas - Brauzzi
Andrew Keir - O'Brien
Paul Muller - Police Commander

References

External links

1963 films
American International Pictures films
Films directed by Charles Frend
World War II submarine films
Italian war films
Films set in the Mediterranean Sea
Macaroni Combat films
French World War II films
Italian World War II films
English-language French films
English-language Italian films
1960s English-language films
1960s Italian films
1960s French films